Chala is a region in Peru.

Chala may also refer to:

Places

India
 Chala, Gujarat, a census town
 Chala, Kannur, a suburb of Kannur in Kerala
 Chala, Thiruvananthapuram, a suburb of Thiruvananthapuram in Kerala

Peru
 Chala, Peru, a town
 Chala District

Elsewhere
 Kingdom of Chakla or Chala, a former kingdom in what is now Tibet
 Chala, Ozurgeti Municipality, Georgia, a village
 the Hellenistic name of Hulwan, Iran
 Lake Chala, a crater lake that straddles the border between Kenya and Tanzania

People
 Chala (name), a list of people with the surname or given name Chala or Chalá

Other uses
 Chala (Jews), a name given to Bukharan Jews who were forcibly converted to Islam
 Chala bread, a traditional Jewish bread; see Challah
 Chala language, a Gur language of Ghana
 Haplochromis sp. 'Chala', a fish species

See also

Chal (name)
 Char-chala, also known as jor-bangla, a style of temple architecture developed in Bengal
Charla (name)